A salt marsh, saltmarsh or salting, also known as a coastal salt marsh or a tidal marsh, is a coastal ecosystem in the upper coastal intertidal zone between land and open saltwater or brackish water that is regularly flooded by the tides. It is dominated by dense stands of salt-tolerant plants such as herbs, grasses, or low shrubs. These plants are terrestrial in origin and are essential to the stability of the salt marsh in trapping and binding sediments. Salt marshes play a large role in the aquatic food web and the delivery of nutrients to coastal waters. They also support terrestrial animals and provide coastal protection.

Salt marshes have historically been endangered by poorly implemented coastal management practices, with land reclaimed for human uses or polluted by upstream agriculture or other industrial coastal uses.  Additionally, sea level rise caused by climate change is endangering other marshes, through erosion and submersion of otherwise tidal marshes. However, recent acknowledgement by both environmentalists and larger society for the importance of saltwater marshes for biodiversity, ecological productivity and other ecosystem services, such as carbon sequestration, has led to an increase in salt marsh restoration and management since the 1980s.

Basic information 

Salt marshes occur on low-energy shorelines in temperate and high-latitudes which can be stable, emerging, or submerging depending if the sedimentation is greater, equal to, or lower than relative sea level rise (subsidence rate plus sea level change), respectively. Commonly these shorelines consist of mud or sand flats (known also as tidal flats or abbreviated to mudflats) which are nourished with sediment from inflowing rivers and streams. These typically include sheltered environments such as embankments, estuaries and the leeward side of barrier islands and spits. In the tropics and sub-tropics they are replaced by mangroves; an area that differs from a salt marsh in that instead of herbaceous plants, they are dominated by salt-tolerant trees.

Most salt marshes have a low topography with low elevations but a vast wide area, making them hugely popular for human populations.
Salt marshes are located among different landforms based on their physical and geomorphological settings. Such marsh landforms include deltaic marshes, estuarine, back-barrier, open coast, embayments and drowned-valley marshes. Deltaic marshes are associated with large rivers where many occur in Southern Europe such as the Camargue, France in the Rhône delta or the Ebro delta in Spain. They are also extensive within the rivers of the Mississippi Delta in the United States. In New Zealand, most salt marshes occur at the head of estuaries in areas where there is little wave action and high sedimentation. Such marshes are located in Awhitu Regional Park in Auckland, the Manawatū Estuary, and the Avon Heathcote Estuary / Ihutai in Christchurch. Back-barrier marshes are sensitive to the reshaping of barriers in the landward side of which they have been formed. They are common along much of the eastern coast of the United States and the Frisian Islands. Large, shallow coastal embayments can hold salt marshes with examples including Morecambe Bay and Portsmouth in Britain and the Bay of Fundy in North America.

Salt marshes are sometimes included in lagoons, and the difference is not very marked; the Venetian Lagoon in Italy, for example, is made up of these sorts of animals and or living organisms belonging to this ecosystem. They have a big impact on the biodiversity of the area. Salt marsh ecology involves complex food webs which include primary producers (vascular plants, macroalgae, diatoms, epiphytes, and phytoplankton), primary consumers (zooplankton, macrozoa, molluscs, insects), and secondary consumers.

The low physical energy and high grasses provide a refuge for animals. Many marine fish use salt marshes as nursery grounds for their young before they move to open waters. Birds may raise their young among the high grasses, because the marsh provides both sanctuary from predators and abundant food sources which include fish trapped in pools, insects, shellfish, and worms.

Worldwide occurrence 
Saltmarshes across 99 countries (essentially worldwide) were mapped by Mcowen et al. 2017.  A total of 5,495,089 hectares of mapped saltmarsh across 43 countries and territories are represented in a Geographic Information Systems polygon shapefile. This estimate is at the relatively low end of previous estimates (2.2–40 Mha). A later study conservatively estimated global saltmarsh extent as 90,800km2 (9,080,000 hectares).  The most extensive saltmarshes worldwide are found outside the tropics, notably including the low-lying, ice-free coasts, bays and estuaries of the North Atlantic which are well represented in their global polygon dataset.

Formation
The formation begins as tidal flats gain elevation relative to sea level by sediment accretion, and subsequently the rate and duration of tidal flooding decreases so that vegetation can colonize on the exposed surface. The arrival of propagules of pioneer species such as seeds or rhizome portions are combined with the development of suitable conditions for their germination and establishment in the process of colonisation. When rivers and streams arrive at the low gradient of the tidal flats, the discharge rate reduces and suspended sediment settles onto the tidal flat surface, helped by the backwater effect of the rising tide. Mats of filamentous blue-green algae can fix silt and clay sized sediment particles to their sticky sheaths on contact which can also increase the erosion resistance of the sediments. This assists the process of sediment accretion to allow colonising species (e.g., Salicornia spp.) to grow. These species retain sediment washed in from the rising tide around their stems and leaves and form low muddy mounds which eventually coalesce to form depositional terraces, whose upward growth is aided by a sub-surface root network which binds the sediment. Once vegetation is established on depositional terraces further sediment trapping and accretion can allow rapid upward growth of the marsh surface such that there is an associated rapid decrease in the depth and duration of tidal flooding. As a result, competitive species that prefer higher elevations relative to sea level can inhabit the area and often a succession of plant communities develops.

Tidal flooding and vegetation zonation

Coastal salt marshes can be distinguished from terrestrial habitats by the daily tidal flow that occurs and continuously floods the area. It is an important process in delivering sediments, nutrients and plant water supply to the marsh. At higher elevations in the upper marsh zone, there is much less tidal inflow, resulting in lower salinity levels. Soil salinity in the lower marsh zone is fairly constant due to everyday annual tidal flow. However, in the upper marsh, variability in salinity is shown as a result of less frequent flooding and climate variations. Rainfall can reduce salinity and evapotranspiration can increase levels during dry periods. As a result, there are microhabitats populated by different species of flora and fauna dependent on their physiological abilities. The flora of a salt marsh is differentiated into levels according to the plants' individual tolerance of salinity and water table levels. Vegetation found at the water must be able to survive high salt concentrations, periodical submersion, and a certain amount of water movement, while plants further inland in the marsh can sometimes experience dry, low-nutrient conditions. It has been found that the upper marsh zones limit species through competition and the lack of habitat protection, while lower marsh zones are determined through the ability of plants to tolerate physiological stresses such as salinity, water submergence and low oxygen levels.

The New England salt marsh is subject to strong tidal influences and shows distinct patterns of zonation. In low marsh areas with high tidal flooding, a monoculture of the smooth cordgrass, Spartina alterniflora dominate, then heading landwards, zones of the salt hay, Spartina patens, black rush, Juncus gerardii and the shrub Iva frutescens are seen respectively. These species all have different tolerances that make the different zones along the marsh best suited for each individual.

Plant species diversity is relatively low, since the flora must be tolerant of salt, complete or partial submersion, and anoxic mud substrate. The most common salt marsh plants are glassworts (Salicornia spp.) and the cordgrass (Spartina spp.), which have worldwide distribution. They are often the first plants to take hold in a mudflat and begin its ecological succession into a salt marsh. Their shoots lift the main flow of the tide above the mud surface while their roots spread into the substrate and stabilize the sticky mud and carry oxygen into it so that other plants can establish themselves as well. Plants such as sea lavenders (Limonium spp.), plantains (Plantago spp.), and varied sedges and rushes grow once the mud has been vegetated by the pioneer species.

Salt marshes are quite photosynthetically active and are extremely productive habitats. They serve as depositories for a large amount of organic matter and are full of decomposition, which feeds a broad food chain of organisms from bacteria to mammals. Many of the halophytic plants such as cordgrass are not grazed at all by higher animals but die off and decompose to become food for micro-organisms, which in turn become food for fish and birds.

Sediment trapping, accretion, and the role of tidal creeks

The factors and processes that influence the rate and spatial distribution of sediment accretion within the salt marsh are numerous. Sediment deposition can occur when marsh species provide a surface for the sediment to adhere to, followed by deposition onto the marsh surface when the sediment flakes off at low tide. The amount of sediment adhering to salt marsh species is dependent on the type of marsh species, the proximity of the species to the sediment supply, the amount of plant biomass, and the elevation of the species. For example, in a study of the Eastern Chongming Island and Jiuduansha Island tidal marshes at the mouth of the Yangtze River, China, the amount of sediment adhering to the species Spartina alterniflora, Phragmites australis, and Scirpus mariqueter decreased with distance from the highest levels of suspended sediment concentrations (found at the marsh edge bordering tidal creeks or the mudflats); decreased with those species at the highest elevations, which experienced the lowest frequency and depth of tidal inundations; and increased with increasing plant biomass. Spartina alterniflora, which had the most sediment adhering to it, may contribute >10% of the total marsh surface sediment accretion by this process.

Salt marsh species also facilitate sediment accretion by decreasing current velocities and encouraging sediment to settle out of suspension. Current velocities can be reduced as the stems of tall marsh species induce hydraulic drag, with the effect of minimising re-suspension of sediment and encouraging deposition. Measured concentrations of suspended sediment in the water column have been shown to decrease from the open water or tidal creeks adjacent to the marsh edge, to the marsh interior, probably as a result of direct settling to the marsh surface by the influence of the marsh canopy.

Inundation and sediment deposition on the marsh surface is also assisted by tidal creeks which are a common feature of salt marshes. Their typically dendritic and meandering forms provide avenues for the tide to rise and flood the marsh surface, as well as to drain water, and they may facilitate higher amounts of sediment deposition than salt marsh bordering open ocean. Sediment deposition is correlated with sediment size: coarser sediments will deposit at higher elevations (closer to the creek) than finer sediments (further from the creek). Sediment size is also often correlated with particular trace metals, and can thus tidal creeks can affect metal distributions and concentrations in salt marshes, in turn affecting the biota. Salt marshes do not however require tidal creeks to facilitate sediment flux over their surface although salt marshes with this morphology seem to be rarely studied.

The elevation of marsh species is important; those species at lower elevations experience longer and more frequent tidal floods and therefore have the opportunity for more sediment deposition to occur. Species at higher elevations can benefit from a greater chance of inundation at the highest tides when increased water depths and marsh surface flows can penetrate into the marsh interior.

Human impacts
 
The coast is a highly attractive natural feature to humans through its beauty, resources, and accessibility. As of 2002, over half of the world's population was estimated to being living within 60 km of the coastal shoreline, making coastlines highly vulnerable to human impacts from daily activities that put pressure on these surrounding natural environments. In the past, salt marshes were perceived as coastal 'wastelands,' causing considerable loss and change of these ecosystems through land reclamation for agriculture, urban development, salt production and recreation. The indirect effects of human activities such as nitrogen loading also play a major role in the salt marsh area. Salt marshes can suffer from dieback in the high marsh and die-off in the low marsh. A study published in 2022 estimates that 22% of saltmarsh loss from 1999-2019 was due to direct human drivers, defined as observable activities occurring at the location of the detected change, such as conversion to aquaculture, agriculture, coastal development, or other physical structures.  Additionally, 30% of saltmarsh gain over this same time period were also due to direct drivers, such as restoration activities or coastal modifications to promote tidal exchange.

Land reclamation
Reclamation of land for agriculture by converting marshland to upland was historically a common practice. Dikes were often built to allow for this shift in land change and to provide flood protection further inland. In recent times intertidal flats have also been reclaimed. For centuries, livestock such as sheep and cattle grazed on the highly fertile salt marsh land. Land reclamation for agriculture has resulted in many changes such as shifts in vegetation structure, sedimentation, salinity, water flow, biodiversity loss and high nutrient inputs. There have been many attempts made to eradicate these problems for example, in New Zealand, the cordgrass Spartina anglica was introduced from England into the Manawatu River mouth in 1913 to try and reclaim the estuary land for farming. A shift in structure from bare tidal flat to pastureland resulted from increased sedimentation and the cordgrass extended out into other estuaries around New Zealand. Native plants and animals struggled to survive as non-natives out competed them. Efforts are now being made to remove these cordgrass species, as the damages are slowly being recognized.

In the Blyth estuary in Suffolk in eastern England, the mid-estuary reclamations (Angel and Bulcamp marshes) that were abandoned in the 1940s have been replaced by tidal flats with compacted soils from agricultural use overlain with a thin veneer of mud. Little vegetation colonisation has occurred in the last 60–75 years and has been attributed to a combination of surface elevations too low for pioneer species to develop, and poor drainage from the compacted agricultural soils acting as an aquiclude. Terrestrial soils of this nature need to adjust from fresh to saline interstitial water by a change in the chemistry and the structure of the soil, accompanied with fresh deposition of estuarine sediment, before salt marsh vegetation can establish. The vegetation structure, species richness, and plant community composition of salt marshes naturally regenerated on reclaimed agricultural land can be compared to adjacent reference salt marshes to assess the success of marsh regeneration.

Upstream agriculture
Cultivation of land upstream from the salt marsh can introduce increased silt inputs and raise the rate of primary sediment accretion on the tidal flats, so that pioneer species can spread further onto the flats and grow rapidly upwards out of the level of tidal inundation. As a result, marsh surfaces in this regime may have an extensive cliff at their seaward edge. At the Plum Island estuary, Massachusetts (U.S.A), stratigraphic cores revealed that during the 18th and 19th century the marsh prograded over subtidal and mudflat environments to increase in area from 6 km2 to 9 km2 after European settlers deforested the land upstream and increased the rate of sediment supply.

Urban development and nitrogen loading

The conversion of marshland to upland for agriculture has in the past century been overshadowed by conversion for urban development. Coastal cities worldwide have encroached onto former salt marshes and in the U.S. the growth of cities looked to salt marshes for waste disposal sites. Estuarine pollution from organic, inorganic, and toxic substances from urban development or industrialisation is a worldwide problem and the sediment in salt marshes may entrain this pollution with toxic effects on floral and faunal species. Urban development of salt marshes has slowed since about 1970 owing to growing awareness by environmental groups that they provide beneficial ecosystem services. They are highly productive ecosystems, and when net productivity is measured in g m−2 yr−1 they are equalled only by tropical rainforests. Additionally, they can help reduce wave erosion on sea walls designed to protect low-lying areas of land from wave erosion.

De-naturalisation of the landward boundaries of salt marshes from urban or industrial encroachment can have negative effects. In the Avon-Heathcote estuary/Ihutai, New Zealand, species abundance and the physical properties of the surrounding margins were strongly linked, and the majority of salt marsh was found to be living along areas with natural margins in the Avon / Ōtākaro and Ōpāwaho / Heathcote river outlets; conversely, artificial margins contained little marsh vegetation and restricted landward retreat. The remaining marshes surrounding these urban areas are also under immense pressure from the human population as human-induced nitrogen enrichment enters these habitats. Nitrogen loading through human-use indirectly affects salt marshes causing shifts in vegetation structure and the invasion of non-native species.

Human impacts such as sewage, urban run-off, agricultural and industrial wastes are running into the marshes from nearby sources. Salt marshes are nitrogen limited and with an increasing level of nutrients entering the system from anthropogenic effects, the plant species associated with salt marshes are being restructured through change in competition. For example, the New England salt marsh is experiencing a shift in vegetation structure where S. alterniflora is spreading from the lower marsh where it predominately resides up into the upper marsh zone. Additionally, in the same marshes, the reed Phragmites australis has been invading the area expanding to lower marshes and becoming a dominant species. P. australis is an aggressive halophyte that can invade disturbed areas in large numbers outcompeting native plants. This loss in biodiversity is not only seen in flora assemblages but also in many animals such as insects and birds as their habitat and food resources are altered.

Sea level rise
Due to the melting of Arctic sea ice and thermal expansion of the oceans, as a result of global warming, sea levels have begun to rise. As with all coastlines, this rise in water levels is predicted to negatively affect salt marshes, by flooding and eroding them. The sea level rise causes more open water zones within the salt marsh. These zones cause erosion along their edges, further eroding the marsh into open water until the whole marsh disintegrates.

While salt marshes are susceptible to threats concerning sea level rise, they are also an extremely dynamic coastal ecosystem. Salt marshes may in fact have the capability to keep pace with a rising sea level, by 2100, mean sea level could see increases between 0.6m to 1.1m. Marshes are susceptible to both erosion and accretion, which play a role in a what is called a bio-geomorphic feedback. Salt marsh vegetation captures sediment to stay in the system which in turn allows for the plants to grow better and thus the plants are better at trapping sediment and accumulate more organic matter. This positive feedback loop potentially allows for salt marsh bed level rates to keep pace with rising sea level rates. However, this feedback is also dependent on other factors like productivity of the vegetation, sediment supply, land subsidence, biomass accumulation, and magnitude and frequency of storms. In a study published by Ü. S. N. Best in 2018, they found that bioaccumulation was the number one factor in a salt marsh's ability to keep up with SLR rates. The salt marsh's resilience depends upon its increase in bed level rate being greater than that of sea levels increasing rate, otherwise the marsh will be overtaken and drowned.

Biomass accumulation can be measured in the form of above-ground organic biomass accumulation, and below-ground inorganic accumulation by means of sediment trapping and sediment settling from suspension. Salt marsh vegetation helps to increase sediment settling because it slows current velocities, disrupts turbulent eddies, and helps to dissipate wave energy. Marsh plant species are known for their tolerance to increased salt exposure due to the common inundation of marshlands. These types of plants are called halophytes. Halophytes are a crucial part of salt marsh biodiversity and their potential to adjust to elevated sea levels. With elevated sea levels, salt marsh vegetation would likely be more exposed to more frequent inundation rates and it must be adaptable or tolerant to the consequential increased salinity levels and anaerobic conditions. There is a common elevation (above the sea level) limit for these plants to survive, where anywhere below the optimal line would lead to anoxic soils due to constant submergence and too high above this line would mean harmful soil salinity levels due to the high rate of evapotranspiration as a result of decreased submergence.
Along with the vertical accretion of sediment and biomass, the accommodation space for marsh land growth must also be considered. Accommodation space is the land available for additional sediments to accumulate and marsh vegetation to colonize laterally. This lateral accommodation space is often limited by anthropogenic structures such as coastal roads, sea walls and other forms of development of coastal lands. A study by Lisa M. Schile, published in 2014, found that across a range of sea level rise rates, marshlands with high plant productivity were resistant against sea level rises but all reached a pinnacle point where accommodation space was necessary for continued survival. The presence of accommodation space allows for new mid/high habitats to form, and for marshes to escape complete inundation.

Mosquito control
Earlier in the 20th century, it was believed that draining salt marshes would help reduce mosquito populations, such as Aedes taeniorhynchus, the black salt marsh mosquito. In many locations, particularly in the northeastern United States, residents and local and state agencies dug straight-lined ditches deep into the marsh flats. The end result, however, was a depletion of killifish habitat. The killifish is a mosquito predator, so the loss of habitat actually led to higher mosquito populations, and adversely affected wading birds that preyed on the killifish. These ditches can still be seen, despite some efforts to refill the ditches.

Crab herbivory and bioturbation

Increased nitrogen uptake by marsh species into their leaves can prompt greater rates of length-specific leaf growth, and increase the herbivory rates of crabs. The burrowing crab Neohelice granulata frequents SW Atlantic salt marshes where high density populations can be found among populations of the marsh species Spartina densiflora and Sarcocornia perennis. In Mar Chiquita lagoon, north of Mar del Plata, Argentina, Neohelice granulata herbivory increased as a likely response to the increased nutrient value of the leaves of fertilised Spartina densiflora plots, compared to non-fertilised plots. Regardless of whether the plots were fertilised or not, grazing by Neohelice granulata also reduced the length specific leaf growth rates of the leaves in summer, while increasing their length-specific senescence rates. This may have been assisted by the increased fungal effectiveness on the wounds left by the crabs.

The salt marshes of Cape Cod, Massachusetts (USA), are experiencing creek bank die-offs of Spartina spp. (cordgrass) that has been attributed to herbivory by the crab Sesarma reticulatum. At 12 surveyed Cape Cod salt marsh sites, 10% – 90% of creek banks experienced die-off of cordgrass in association with a highly denuded substrate and high density of crab burrows. Populations of Sesarma reticulatum are increasing, possibly as a result of the degradation of the coastal food web in the region. The bare areas left by the intense grazing of cordgrass by Sesarma reticulatum at Cape Cod are suitable for occupation by another burrowing crab, Uca pugnax, which are not known to consume live macrophytes. The intense bioturbation of salt marsh sediments from this crab's burrowing activity has been shown to dramatically reduce the success of Spartina alterniflora and Suaeda maritima seed germination and established seedling survival, either by burial or exposure of seeds, or uprooting or burial of established seedlings. However, bioturbation by crabs may also have a positive effect. In New Zealand, the tunnelling mud crab Helice crassa has been given the stately name of an 'ecosystem engineer' for its ability to construct new habitats and alter the access of nutrients to other species. Their burrows provide an avenue for the transport of dissolved oxygen in the burrow water through the oxic sediment of the burrow walls and into the surrounding anoxic sediment, which creates the perfect habitat for special nitrogen cycling bacteria. These nitrate reducing (denitrifying) bacteria quickly consume the dissolved oxygen entering into the burrow walls to create the oxic mud layer that is thinner than that at the mud surface. This allows a more direct diffusion path for the export of nitrogen (in the form of gaseous nitrogen (N2)) into the flushing tidal water.

Restoration and management

The perception of bay salt marshes as a coastal 'wasteland' has since changed, acknowledging that they are one of the most biologically productive habitats on earth, rivalling tropical rainforests. Salt marshes are ecologically important, providing habitats for native migratory fish and acting as sheltered feeding and nursery grounds. They are now protected by legislation in many countries to prevent the loss of these ecologically important habitats. In the United States and Europe, they are now accorded a high level of protection by the Clean Water Act and the Habitats Directive respectively. With the impacts of this habitats and their importance now realised, a growing interest in restoring salt marshes through managed retreat or the reclamation of land has been established. However, many Asian countries such as China still need to recognise the value of marshlands. With their ever-growing populations and intense development along the coast, the value of salt marshes tends to be ignored and the land continues to be reclaimed.

Bakker et al. (1997) suggests two options available for restoring salt marshes. The first is to abandon all human interference and leave the salt marsh to complete its natural development. These types of restoration projects are often unsuccessful as vegetation tends to struggle to revert to its original structure and the natural tidal cycles are shifted due to land changes. The second option suggested by Bakker et al. (1997) is to restore the destroyed habitat into its natural state either at the original site or as a replacement at a different site. Under natural conditions, recovery can take 2–10 years or even longer depending on the nature and degree of the disturbance and the relative maturity of the marsh involved. Marshes in their pioneer stages of development will recover more rapidly than mature marshes as they are often first to colonize the land. It is important to note that restoration can often be sped up through the replanting of native vegetation.

This last approach is often the most practiced and generally more successful than allowing the area to naturally recover on its own. The salt marshes in the state of Connecticut in the United States have long been an area lost to fill and dredging. As of 1969, the Tidal Wetland Act was introduced that ceased this practice, but despite the introduction of the act, the system was still degrading due to alterations in tidal flow. One area in Connecticut is the marshes on Barn Island. These marshes were diked then impounded with salt and brackish marsh during 1946–1966. As a result, the marsh shifted to a freshwater state and became dominated by the invasive species P. australis, Typha angustifolia and T. latifolia that have little ecological connection to the area.

By 1980, a restoration programme was put in place that has now been running for over 20 years. This programme has aimed to reconnect the marshes by returning tidal flow along with the ecological functions and characteristics of the marshes back to their original state. In the case of Barn Island, reduction of the invasive species has been initiated, re-establishing the tidal-marsh vegetation along with animal species such as fish and insects. This example highlights that considerable time and effort is needed to effectively restore salt marsh systems. The timescale for salt marsh recovery is dependent on the development stage of the marsh, type and extent of the disturbance, geographical location and the environmental and physiological stress factors to the marsh-associated flora and fauna.

Although much effort has gone into restoring salt marshes worldwide, further research is needed. There are many setbacks and problems associated with marsh restoration that require careful long-term monitoring. Information on all components of the salt marsh ecosystem should be understood and monitored from sedimentation, nutrient, and tidal influences, to behaviour patterns and tolerances of both flora and fauna species. Once a better understanding of these processes is acquired, and not just locally, but over a global scale, then more sound and practical management and restoration efforts can be implemented to preserve these valuable marshes and restore them to their original state.

While humans are situated along coastlines, there will always be the possibility of human-induced disturbances despite the number of restoration efforts we plan to implement. Dredging, pipelines for offshore petroleum resources, highway construction, accidental toxic spills or just plain carelessness are examples that will for some time now and into the future be the major influences of salt marsh degradation.

In addition to restoring and managing salt marsh systems based on scientific principles, the opportunity should be taken to educate public audiences of their importance biologically and their purpose as serving as a natural buffer for flood protection. Because salt marshes are often located next to urban areas, they are likely to receive more visitors than remote wetlands. By physically seeing the marsh, people are more likely to take notice and be more aware of the environment around them. An example of public involvement occurred at the Famosa Slough State Marine Conservation Area in San Diego, where a "friends" group worked for over a decade in trying to prevent the area from being developed.  Eventually, the  site was bought by the city and the group worked together to restore the area. The project involved removing of invasive species and replanting with native ones, along with public talks to other locals, frequent bird walks and clean-up events.

Research methods
There is a diverse range and combination of methodologies employed to understand the hydrological dynamics in salt marshes and their ability to trap and accrete sediment. Sediment traps are often used to measure rates of marsh surface accretion when short term deployments (e.g. less than one month) are required. These circular traps consist of pre-weighed filters that are anchored to the marsh surface, then dried in a laboratory and re-weighed to determine the total deposited sediment.

For longer term studies (e.g. more than one year) researchers may prefer to measure sediment accretion with marker horizon plots. Marker horizons consist of a mineral such as feldspar that is buried at a known depth within wetland substrates to record the increase in overlying substrate over long time periods. In order to gauge the amount of sediment suspended in the water column, manual or automated samples of tidal water can be poured through pre-weighed filters in a laboratory then dried to determine the amount of sediment per volume of water.

Another method for estimating suspended sediment concentrations is by measuring the turbidity of the water using optical backscatter probes, which can be calibrated against water samples containing a known suspended sediment concentration to establish a regression relationship between the two. Marsh surface elevations may be measured with a stadia rod and transit, electronic theodolite, Real-Time Kinematic Global Positioning System, laser level or electronic distance meter (total station). Hydrological dynamics include water depth, measured automatically with a pressure transducer, or with a marked wooden stake, and water velocity, often using electromagnetic current meters.

See also

 Bayou
 Beach meadow
 Biodiversity action plan
 Blue carbon
 Body of water
 Bog
 Brackish marsh
 California coastal salt marsh
 Fen
 Halligen (salt meadow islands)
 Halophyte
 High marsh
 Lagoon
 Low marsh
 Mangrove swamp
 Marine coastal ecosystem
 Marsh
 Mesopotamian Marshes
 Mudflat
 Ocean Data Viewer: contains worldwide salt marshes dataset
 Outwelling
 Plant community
 Salt flat
 Salt marsh die-off
 Seagrass
 Saltwater swamp
 Tidal marsh
 Freshwater marsh
 Wetland

References

Further reading

External links

Friends of Famosa Slough
Geography resource for schools
 Johnson, CY (2006) "Cause sought as marshes turn into barren flats" The Boston Globe
 Tidal Salt Marshes Project Regeneration
Marine Nature Study Area operated by the Town of Hempstead: Dept. of Conservation & Waterways, located in Oceanside, New York, USA

Blue carbon
Soil
 
Coastal geography
Coastal and oceanic landforms